Christine Leunens (born 29 December 1964) is a New Zealand-Belgian novelist. She is the author of several novels including Caging Skies, which was the basis and inspiration for the film Jojo Rabbit, by New Zealand Film Director Taika Waititi.

Life 

Leunens was born on 29 December 1964 in Hartford, Connecticut, in the United States; her mother was Italian, her father Belgian.

She has a bachelor's degree in French from the University of North Carolina, and an ALM in literature from the Harvard Extension School in Cambridge, Massachusetts. She moved to New Zealand in 2006, and received a grant from the International Institute of Modern Letters of Victoria University of Wellington to write a novel as part of a PhD; she completed the degree in 2012 with a two-part thesis on Literary Mothers-in-Law.

Literary career 

In 1996 she won a prize for 'best scenario' from the Centre National du Cinéma in Paris. In 1999 her novel Primordial Soup was published. The Sunday Times described it as a "remarkable debut novel", and Publishers Weekly as "kinky, grotesque and very funny" and "not for the faint of heart".

In 2007 she published Caging Skies, a World War II historical novel set in Vienna, which was described by Le Monde as a "beautiful novel, powerful, different, and ambitious" about "love so total that it locks up, isolates and colonises the partner until destruction annihilates the outside world". The French edition was nominated for the Prix Médicis étranger in 2007.

Her third novel, A Can Of Sunshine, written as part of her PhD, was published in 2013.

Taika Waititi adapted Caging Skies into the screenplay for the film Jojo Rabbit, which won an Academy Award for 'best adapted screenplay' in 2019, as well as a Humanitas Prize for writing "intended to promote human dignity, meaning and freedom".

In 2022 Leunens published In Amber's Wake, a novel "set against the background of the anti-nuclear movement, Springbok Tour and the Rainbow Warrior [bombing]". A film adaptation is being produced by Mimi Polk Gitlin.

Awards and residencies 

 UNESCO City of Literature Prague Writer-in-Residence in 2023

Novels 

 Primordial Soup (1999)
 Caging Skies (2008)
 A Can of Sunshine (2013)
 In Amber's Wake (2022)

References

External links 

 

International Institute of Modern Letters alumni
Belgian women novelists
21st-century New Zealand novelists
21st-century New Zealand women writers
New Zealand women novelists
21st-century Belgian women writers
Harvard Extension School alumni
European writers
Academy Awards
1964 births
Living people